"Crying on a Suitcase" is a song written by Neil Thrasher, Tom Shapiro and Lee Thomas Miller, and recorded by American country music artist Casey James. It was released in June 2012 as the second single from James' self-titled debut album.

Content
"Crying on a Suitcase" is a midtempo song about a male who is trying to convince himself to catch up to a former lover at the airport and give the relationship a second chance before her airplane leaves.

James said that he enjoyed the song the first time that he heard it, but also said that he was reluctant to record it because "the guy who sang the demo really sang it".

Critical reception
Billy Dukes of Taste of Country gave the song 3 stars out of 5, saying that James' singing was "appropriately urgent" but that the storyline made it "a difficult song to get into". He also criticized the melody as "choppy".

Music video
The music video was directed by TK McKamy and premiered in August 2012.

Charts

It became his first top fifteen hit in January 2013.

Weekly charts

Year-end charts

References

2012 singles
Casey James songs
Columbia Records singles
Songs written by Lee Thomas Miller
Songs written by Tom Shapiro
Songs written by Neil Thrasher
Music videos directed by TK McKamy
Song recordings produced by Chris Lindsey
2012 songs